"I Surrender (To the Spirit of the Night)" is a song by English singer Samantha Fox from her self-titled second studio album (1987). The song was written by Jon Astrop, Karen Moline and Mark Shreeve and produced by Astrop. It was released in July 1987 as the album's second single.

The single peaked at number 25 on the UK Singles Chart and charted in most European countries inside the top 30. The single was not released in the United States.

Track listings
7-inch single
A. "I Surrender (To the Spirit of the Night)" (7″ version) – 3:00
B. "The Best Is Yet to Come" – 4:50

12-inch single
A. "I Surrender (To the Spirit of the Night)" (extended version) – 6:35
B1. "The Best Is Yet to Come" – 4:50
B2. "I Surrender (To the Spirit of the Night)" (7″ version) – 3:00

Charts

References

1987 singles
1987 songs
Jive Records singles
Samantha Fox songs
Songs written by Mark Shreeve